The Speakeasy is an immersive theater production set in the 1920s during prohibition in the United States. The show takes place inside a San Francisco speakeasy and follows the stories of the staff, performers, and guests. The audience is free to move about the environment (often referred to as promenade theater) and craft their own experience in what some critics refers to as “choose-your-own-adventure.”

History 
The Speakeasy was originally conceived by Nick A. Olivero and was developed by Barry Eitel, Geoffrey Libby, and Olivero in 2013. It   opened on January 10, 2014 in San Francisco’s Tenderloin District at the Boxcar Theatre Studios. The Speakeasy ran for seventy-five performances over five months to sold out houses,    directed by Peter Ruocco, Leah Gardner, and Nick A. Olivero. David Gluck was the General Manager. The production closed on June 16, 2014.

The play was remounted on December 10, 2016 in San Francisco’s North Beach District. It was written by Bennett Fisher and Nick A. Olivero and directed by Michael French, Leah Gardner, Erin Gilley, and Olivero. The new production cost over $2 million dollars and introduced a new funding model.

In January 2019 Boxcar Theatre hosted the "SF Sketchfest at The Speakeasy", where they co-produced six immersive comedy shows.

The Speakeasy was nominated for Theatre Bay Area awards in 2019. It was also named among the "Best Places to Play 2017" by San Francisco Magazine and "Best of the Bay" by 7x7 Magazine.

Characteristics 
At the entrance, guests receive an “electronic telegram” in the form of a text which includes instructions to meet a “contact” at one of three locations. Once inside, guests receive a set of “House Rules” which help guide them throughout the night.

The Speakeasy has six main rooms to explore: The Bar, which serves prohibition inspired cocktails; a Casino, where guests are allowed to play blackjack, craps, and roulette (for entertainment purposes only); a Cabaret, which has Vaudeville entertainment; Sal’s Office, which has candlestick telephones and peepholes to observe through; a dressing room, which guests can watch the drama behind a one-way mirror; and a Parlor for more intimate theatrical scenes and improvised moments.

Reception 
The show has been subject to reviews from specialists in local and national media.

References 

Postmodern plays
2014 plays
Theatre in San Francisco
American plays
English-language plays
Site-specific theatre